Kaden Hensel and Adam Hubble won in the final 7–6(5), 3–6, [11–9], against Scott Lipsky and David Martin.

Seeds

Draw

Draw

References
 Doubles Draw

Challenger Banque Nationale de Rimouski
Challenger de Drummondville